The dusky pipistrelle (Pipistrellus hesperidus) is a small pipistrelle bat found in Africa.

References

Taxa named by Coenraad Jacob Temminck
Mammals described in 1840
Pipistrellus
Bats of Africa